Pieck Range is a short mountain range surmounted by Zwiesel Mountain, located at the east side of Humboldt Graben in the Petermann Ranges, Wohlthat Mountains in Antarctica.

It was discovered and plotted from air photos by German Antarctic Expedition, 1938–39. Mapped from air photos and surveys by Norwegian Antarctic Expedition, 1956–60; remapped by Soviet Antarctic Expedition, 1960–61, and named after Wilhelm Pieck, first President of communist East Germany.

References

Mountain ranges of Queen Maud Land
Princess Astrid Coast